One Step Closer is the fifth album by country music singer Sylvia.

Track listing
"Fallin' in Love" (Randy Goodrum, Brent Maher) – 2:55
"One Step Closer" (Craig Bickhardt, Maher) – 3:18
"Breakin' It" (Mark Germino) – 3:49
"Cry Just a Little Bit" (Bob Heatlie) – 2:56
"I Can't Help the Way That I Don't Feel" (Chris Waters, Michael Garvin, Tom Shapiro) – 4:50
"Read All About It" (Kent Robbins, Todd Cerney) – 3:29
"Only the Shadows Know" (Robbins, David Gibson) – 3:59
"I Love You by Heart" (Duet with Michael Johnson) (Jerry Gillespie, Stan Webb) – 3:15
"True Blue" (Holly Dunn, Madeline Stone) – 3:01
"Eyes Like Mine" (Gary Burr) – 3:49

Personnel
Sylvia - lead vocals
Eddie Bayers - drums
Larry Byrom - acoustic guitar, electric guitar, electric guitar solos
Quitman Dennis - tenor saxophone
Sonny Garrish - steel guitar
Jon Goin - electric guitar
Bobby Ogdin - keyboards
Don Potter - acoustic guitar
Tom Rutledge - acoustic guitar
Jack Williams - bass guitar

Chart performance

1985 albums
Sylvia (singer) albums
Albums produced by Brent Maher
RCA Records albums